was a Japanese film actor. He appeared in more than 80 films from 1921 to 1970.

Career
Starting out in Asakusa Opera, Watanabe shifted to film in 1921, joining Makino Educational Pictures, a precursor to Makino Film Productions. Moving to other studios, he eventually settled at Shochiku's Kamata studio in 1925 and eventually became established as a comic star, often appearing in Torajiro Saito's films. He eventually joined the revue company of Roppa Furukawa and made films at Toho. In the postwar era, he appeared in a number of films by Akira Kurosawa.

Selected filmography

1921: Kyôdainaka wa
1922: Aa, Konishi junsa
1922: Aru shinbun kisha no shuki
1924: Shiragiku no uta
1924: Nemurerû daichî
1924: Mikazuki Oroku: zenpen
1925: Kagaribi no yoru
1925: Momoiro no toge
1925: Mahjong
1925: Umi no himitsu
1925: Koizuma - Rakugoka Koiasa
1925: Yôsei chi ni otsureba
1925: Aisai no himitsu
1925: Mikazuki oroku
1925: Mâjan
1925: Korerâ seibatsû
1925: Goiken gomuyô
1926: Nayamashiki koro
1926: Don Kyûnoshin
1926: Karabotan
1926: Ama - Nangoku-hen
1926: Cosmos saku koro
1926: Junanbana - Hayashi Kenichi [bank president]
1926: Yume no koban musume shiranami
1926: Venisû no funauta
1926: Shinkon jidai
1927: Kyûkanchô - Torakichi Ôyama - Chimney sweeper
1927: Shôwa jidai - Yasuda's assistant
1927: Kafe no joô
1927: Mura no isha gendai no on'nanoko e
1927: Shinsô no bijô
1927: Shinkônshâ kyoiku
1927: Mura no isha to modan garû
1928: Moshimo kanojo ga
1928: Katsudôkyô
1928: Renai futari angya
1928: Odore wakamono
1928: Hito no yo no sugata
1928: Hirotta hanayome
1928: Riku no ôja
1928: Teishû soju
1928: Nonkimono
1928: Gokurôsama
1928: Doraku goshinan
1928: Appare bîdanshî
1929: Ahiru onna
1929: Iroke tappuri
1929: Kibô
1929: Yôkina uta
1929: Oyaji to sono ko
1929: Shunyo kôitatehikî
1929: Renai dai-ikka
1929: Aishite chodaî
1930: Shingun - Soldier
1930: Reijin - A gentleman
1930: Kânôjo wa dôkoê iku
1930: Hohoemu jinsei
1930: Modern okusama
1930: Umi no kôshinkyoku
1930: Seishun no chi wa odoru
1930: Ubawareta kuchibiru
1930: Tatakarê teishû
1930: Sêntantekî dawanê
1930: Îroke dangô sodoki
1930: Chotto demashita sânkakuyarô
1931: Ai yo jinrui to tomo ni are - Zenpen: Nihon hen - Yoshida, secretary
1931: Machî no runpên
1931: Kagoya dainagôn
1931: The Neighbor's Wife and Mine - Shibano Shinnsaku
1931: Runpen niwaka daijin
1931: Kono ana wo miyo
1932: Kuma no deru kaikonchi - Sahei
1932: Amerika koro
1932: Midori no kishu - Horse groom Genzo
1932: Mâchi seîshun sôtohen
1932: Shin senjô
1932: Konjiki yasha - Tadatsugu Toyama
1932: Modan hakusho
1934: Karisome no kuchibeni - Ogata
1937: Gyudarê chôtokyu
1939: Roppa no Ôkubo Hikozaemon
1939: Musume no negai wa tada hitotsu
1939: Roppa no komoriuta
1939: Tokyo blues
1939: Roppa uta no miyako e yuku
1940: Oyako kujira
1941: Kinô kieta otoko - Kanko
1941: Kodakara fûfu - Watanabe, Goto's secretary
1941: Hasegawa Roppa no Iemitsu to Hikoza
1941: Otoko no hanamichi - Kasuke
1943: Ongaku dai-shingun
1944: Tanoshiki kana jinsei - Clockmaker Shûkichi
1944: Shibaidô
1945: Tokkan ekichô
1947: Todoroki sensei
1947: One Wonderful Sunday - Yamamoto
1947: Shin baka jidadi: Zenpen
1947: Shin baka jidai: kôhen
1948: Konjiki yasha: Kôhen
1949: Nodojiman-kyô jidai
1949: Hana kurabe tanuki-goten
1949: Otoko no namida
1949: Umon torimonochô: Nazo no hachijûhachi-ya - Matsu
1949: Odoroki ikka
1950: Ishinaka sensei gyôjôki
1950: Shimikin no muteki keirin-ô
1950: Enoken no happyakuya-danuki ôabare
1951: Umon torimonochô: Katame ookami - 'Chongire' no Matsu
1951: Joshu Garasu
1952: Yagura daiko - Zenba
1952: Musume jûku wa mada junjô yo - Yoshibei Echigoya
1952: Ikiru - Patient
1952: Ashita wa gekkyûbi - Furugaki
1952: Hanayome wa na muko chanbara bushi
1953: Botchan - Teacher
1954: Jyazû sutaa tanjô
1954: Seven Samurai - Bun Seller
1954: Natsu matsuri rakugochoyo
1954: Sorcerer's Orb
1954: Heiji torimono hikae: yurei daimyo
1955: Kago de iku no wa
1954: Appare koshinuke chindochu
1955: I Live in Fear - Factory Worker Ishida
1956: Taifû sôdôki
1957: Hesokuri oyaji
1957: Akuma no kao - New croquette shop owner
1957: Donzoko: Ralé - Kuna
1957: Hana kurenai ni - Sen'yama
1957: Musume sanbagarasu
1958: Nitôhei monogatari: Shindara kami-sama no maki
1958: Nitôhei monogatari: Aa senyû no maki
1959: Senryô-jishi - Kansuke
1960: Tenpô rokkasen - Jigoku no hanamichi
1960: Kyôsaitô sôsai ni eikô are - Tanimura
1960: Tôkkaidô kaginuke chindochu
1961: Shin nitôhei monogatari medetaku gaisen no maki
1961: Hatamoto kenka taka - Yobei Tajimaya
1961: Yojimbo - The Cooper - Coffin-Maker
1961: Kaidan Oiwa no borei
1962: Nippon no obaachan - Suzumura
1962: Hatamoto taikutsu otoko: nazo no sango yashiki
1963: Bakurô ichidai - Ogasawara
1963: Okashina yatsu - Takuetsu
1965: The Scarlet Camellia - Yosuke
1965: Red Beard - Patient B
1966: Ohana han - Kitakawara, Ôzu town mayor
1968: Sukurappu shûdan
1970: Dodes'ka-den - Mr. Tanba (final film role)

References

External links
 

1898 births
1977 deaths
People from Tokyo
Japanese male film actors
Japanese male silent film actors
20th-century Japanese male actors